Loupiac may refer to the following places in France:

 Loupiac, Gironde, a commune in the Gironde department
 Loupiac, Lot, a commune in the Lot department
 Loupiac, Tarn, a commune in the Tarn department